Henry Whitaker (c. 1549 – 1589) was an English politician.

He was a Member (MP) of the Parliament of England for Westbury in 1586.

References

1549 births
1589 deaths
English MPs 1586–1587